Michael Collier (born 27 September 1971) is a Sierra Leonean swimmer. He competed in the men's 50 metre freestyle event at the 1996 Summer Olympics.

References

External links
 

1971 births
Living people
Sierra Leonean male freestyle swimmers
Olympic swimmers of Sierra Leone
Swimmers at the 1996 Summer Olympics
Place of birth missing (living people)